S. S. Rajamouli is an Indian film director and screenwriter who primarily works in Telugu cinema. He is the highest paid director in India,  and is known for his action, fantasy, and epic genre films. Three of his films, Baahubali: The Beginning (2015), Baahubali 2: The Conclusion (2017) and RRR (2022) are among the top six highest grossing-films in India to date.

Awards and nominations

Notes

References

External links 

 

Rajamouli, S. S.
Rajamouli, S. S.
S. S. Rajamouli
Lists of awards received by Indian film director